Ibrahim Ahmad Abd Al-Sattar Muhammad Al-Tikriti (9 September 1950 – 28 October 2010) was the chief of staff of the Iraqi armed forces under the rule of Saddam Hussein from 1999 until 2003. He was taken into custody on 15 May 2003.

He was the jack of spades in the deck of most-wanted Iraqi playing cards and was reported by CENTCOM to be in custody in May 2003.

On 2 March 2009, Abdul Sattar was sentenced to life in prison for his role in the violent repression of a Shiite uprising in 1991.

He died from cancer on 28 October 2010 while being held in US and Iraqi custody.

References

1956 births
2010 deaths
Military leaders of the Iraq War
Arab Socialist Ba'ath Party – Iraq Region politicians
Iraqi prisoners sentenced to life imprisonment
Prisoners sentenced to life imprisonment by Iraq
Iraqi people who died in prison custody
Prisoners who died in Iraqi detention
Deaths from cancer in Iraq
Most-wanted Iraqi playing cards
Iraq War prisoners of war
Iraqi prisoners of war